The Love Flower is a 1920 American silent drama film produced by D. W. Griffith and released through the then nascent United Artist company of which Griffith was a founding partner.

Plot
As described in a film magazine, Thomas Bevan (MacQuarrie) has served an undeserved term in prison. He marries again, but his new wife is unsympathetic towards his daughter Stella (Dempster) because of the father's great great love for and comradeship with his daughter. Matthew Crane (Randolf) of the Secret Service, who sent Bevan to prison, comes to the town where Bevan is now living. Bevan's wife is unfaithful, and a loyal servant (Lestina) goes after Bevan, who had been leaving on a business trip, and tells him of the treachery. Bevan goes back to verify the statement, and in a fight the man (Kent) is accidentally killed. Crane hears of the murder and intercepts Stella, who had been on her way to the motorboat Bevan had purchased for his getaway. Bevan comes up from the rear and makes a captive of Crane until he and his daughter leave. They eventually land on a South Sea island and happily live there with one servant. Visiting a nearby island to trade with a native, Stella meets Bruce Sanders (Barthelmess), a wealthy plantation owner out for excitement. She wants to be friends with him, but fears he may be a federal officer looking for her father. Sanders is puzzled by her cold manner. Sanders returns to the mainland where he meets Crane who is hot on the trail. Crane persuades Sanders to take him to the island where Stella and Bevan live, which he, unsuspecting, gladly does. On their arrival Crane arrests Bevan and Stella, believing Sanders deliberately brought Crane there, will have nothing to do with him. Stella sinks Sanders's boat, marooning all four on the island. When the boat is washed ashore, Sanders to show his good faith sinks it again, and Stella confesses that she loves him. Crane's comrades send help to him on the island, and Bevan refuses to get on the boat. After a dramatic fight, Crane believes Bevan has drowned. Stella and Sanders return and wed on the mainland and make plans to rescue her father.

Cast
Richard Barthelmess as Bruce Sanders
Carol Dempster as Stella Bevan
George MacQuarrie as Stella's father, Thomas Bevan
Anders Randolf as Matthew Crane
Florence Short as Mrs. Bevan
Crauford Kent as her visitor
Adolph Lestina as Bevan's old servant
William James as Crane's assistant
Jack Manning as Crane's assistant

Production

Griffith filmed The Love Flower simultaneously with The Idol Dancer (1920) in Fort Lauderdale, Florida, and Nassau, Bahamas, in December 1919 to fulfill a contract with First National Pictures, but after previewing the film on April 2, 1920, before the American Newspaper Publishers Association in New York, he purchased the rights to The Love Flower for $400,000. Additional underwater footage of Dempster was shot in Florida along with scenes of her and MacQuarrie against a black background. The reedited film was then released by United Artists.

References

External links

The Love Flower at AllMovie
The Love Flower at Virtual History
Southseascinema.org
The Love Flower available for free download at Internet Archive
DVD availability at Grapevine Video and Oldies.com

1920 films
American silent feature films
Films directed by D. W. Griffith
Films based on short fiction
1920 drama films
Silent American drama films
American black-and-white films
1920s American films